The Wemmers River is a river near Franschhoek in the Western Cape Province of South Africa.

Dams
 Wemmershoek Dam

See also
 List of rivers in South Africa

References 

Rivers of the Western Cape